Tazehabad-e Amaleh (also Romanized as Tāzehābād-e ‘Amaleh; also known as Tāzehābād) is a village in Miyan Darband Rural District, in the Central District of Kermanshah County, Kermanshah Province, Iran. At the 2006 census, its population was 287, in 66 families.

References 

Populated places in Kermanshah County